"Communist bandit" is an anti-communist epithet directed at members of the Chinese Communist Party. The term originated from the Nationalist Government in 1927. Nowadays outside mainland China, some Chinese people use the term "中共" (literally "Chinese Communist") to refer to Communist China or the Chinese Communist Party. It could also be translated to the English term "commie".

Etymology 
The characters for "Communist bandits", or gòngfěi, can be analysed in the following manner:
 Gòng is a shorter writing for the term meaning "communism" (共產主義).
 Fěi means "bandits". The term of fěi to excoriate the adversary was first used during the Warlord Era, in the form feifei, or "bandit troops".

History 
The term of "Communist bandits" to describe the Chinese Communist Party was began in the tumultuous years of the Chinese Civil War between the Nationalists and the Communists. On July 15, 1947, Document 0744 ordered the Communist Party and its forces to be called "Communist bandits" as a form of rectification of names, to the exclusion of all other terms, such as "Red bandits" (in Chinese 赤匪). Along with the term fei, the term was used in official documents to describe the authorities established on Mainland China and their agencies, and in several slogans such as "Fight against Gongfei's Animalistic Life". In the 1980s, the term was replaced by "Chinese Communist Authorities".

The term is used today as an insult against Beijing authorities, their sympathizers or just chinese mainlanders, particularly by Taiwanese independentists and Republic of China supporters.  In 1996, Microsoft halted sales of its Windows 95 operating system in mainland China due to discoveries that it contained the term in Chinese-language input method software bundled with the operating system following police raids on computer stores. In addition, the term is also used towards non-Chinese communists or communist-governed countries, such as Yuenán gòngfei (directed at Communist Party of Vietnam and the Vietnamese people), or   Běihán gòngfei (directed at Workers' Party of Korea and the North Koreans).

In May 2020, it became known that YouTube had been deleting any use of the term since October 2019. Comments containing the phrase would disappear without a given reason shortly after being posted. Alphabet, owner of YouTube, said the removal of such comments was "an error".

Popular culture
There is a pastry shop in Chiayi, Taiwan named 共匪餅 meaning "Communist Bandit Pastries” which makes light of the martial law era epithet.

See also 
Mandarin Chinese profanity against Communists
Communization
Communist society
Communist Party of the Republic of China

References 

Anti-communism in China
Anti-communist terminology
Mandarin words and phrases
White Terror (Taiwan)